Commatica crossotorna is a moth in the family Gelechiidae. It was described by Edward Meyrick in 1929. It is found in Guyana and Colombia.

References

Commatica
Moths described in 1929